Bearberry is an unincorporated community in central Alberta in Mountain View County, located  west of Highway 22,  northwest of Calgary.  It is named for the bearberry that grows in the vicinity.

There was a major forest fire, the Dogrib Fire, in 2001, which threatened the community.  In 2003, a major bridge was reconstructed in Bearberry.  Shell Oil has a plant near the community.  "Sour gas" is mined in and around Bearberry.

It is a tourist destination with snowmobile trails, and is also the site of a bed and breakfast.  The area west of the community is described as "pristine wilderness area [that] is also home to the bear, wolf and cougar whose prey includes wild horses."

References

External links
 Youtube of a trip to Bearberry, Alberta
 Flickr of a trip to Bearberry, Alberta
 Outdoors webshots of a trip to Bearberry, Alberta

Localities in Mountain View County